Aqui há talento was an older Portuguese version of the Got Talent series. It was launched on RTP1 on February 1, 2007. Singers, dancers, comedians, variety acts, and other performers competed against each other for a €10,000 money prize. It was hosted by Sílvia Alberto. The judges were Paulo Dias, Sílvia Rizzo and Joaquim Monchique.

External links

2007 Portuguese television series debuts
2007 Portuguese television series endings
Portugal
Television series by Fremantle (company)
Portuguese television series based on British television series
Rádio e Televisão de Portugal original programming